Miss Météo is a Canadian Quebec French-language television series that airs on Séries+. It is a 30 minute adaptation of the Quebec French language film Miss Météo. The same actors are used in the TV series as were used in the film.

Storyline
Myriam Monette, a not very conformist and slightly whimsical Miss Weatherwoman, is now 40 years old, has a new boyfriend and a new mandate at Channel Météo (also called Channel M). On the surface, nothing has changed. In reality, nothing is the same anymore. Like a green lawn on a summer day suddenly covered in snow, Myriam went to bed a confirmed single "adulteen" and woke up in love, living with someone else and undergoing major changes.

Main characters
Myriam Monette (played by Anne-Marie Cadieux): She is Miss Weatherwoman. A woman that we could call an "adulteen".
François Larivière (played by Patrice Robitaille): The boyfriend of Myriam.
Brigitte Caron (played by Sophie Prégent): She is the boss of Myriam.
Josiane Després (played by Mahée Paiement): She is one of the friends of Myriam at Channel M.

References

External links
Official Miss Météo website 
Game on Miss Météo website 

2008 Canadian television series debuts
2009 Canadian television series endings
Television shows filmed in Montreal
Live action television shows based on films
2000s Canadian sitcoms
Cultural depictions of weather presenters